Junior or Juniors may refer to:

Arts and entertainment

Music

 Junior (Junior Mance album), 1959
 Junior (Röyksopp album), 2009
 Junior (Kaki King album), 2010
 Junior (LaFontaines album), 2019

Films
 Junior (1994 film), an American film starring Arnold Schwarzenegger
 Junior (2008 film), a documentary about Quebec junior league ice hockey
 Juniors (film), a 2003 Telugu film

Characters
 Junior, the main protagonist in Storks
 Junior Soprano, the present-day patriarch on the TV show The Sopranos
 Junior, son of the Gorgs in the Fraggle Rock television series
 Junior, title character of the film Problem Child
 Jr. (Xenosaga), short for Gaignun Kukai, Jr., a character in the Xenosaga series
 Junior Asparagus, in the children's show VeggieTales
 Junior, a character from SpongeBob SquarePants
 Junior, Mr. Conductor's cousin in the film Thomas and the Magic Railroad.

Other
 Junior (novel), by Macaulay Culkin

Aircraft
 Ekolot JK-05L Junior, a Polish ultralight aircraft
 PZL-112 Junior, a Polish training aircraft
 SZD-51 Junior, a Polish-made, training and club glider

Education 
 Junior (education year), the third year of high school or college in the United States
 Junior school, a stage of education in some countries

People
 Junior (suffix), generational title
 Junior (name), a list of people with the given name, nickname or surname

Sport
 Junior athletics, age-based athletic training and completion category
 Instances of junior athletic competition:
 Junior football (disambiguation)
 Atlético Junior, Colombian football team
 Argentinos Juniors, Argentine centennial sports club
 Junior ice hockey
 Junior, participant in competitive dog-exhibition discipline of Junior showmanship

Other uses
 Junior Lake (Vancouver Island), a lake in British Columbia, Canada
 Junior (chess), a computer program
 Juniors, a type of US standard women's clothing size
 Nissan Junior, a pickup sold in Asia and Iran
 Junior, West Virginia, a town in Barbour County, West Virginia

See also
 
 
 Junior's (disambiguation)
 Junior Lake (disambiguation)